Laughton may refer to:

People
Laughton (surname)

Places

United Kingdom
Laughton, East Sussex, England
Laughton, Leicestershire, England
Laughton, South Kesteven, Lincolnshire, England
Laughton, West Lindsey, Lincolnshire, England
Laughton-en-le-Morthen, South Yorkshire, England

United States
Laughton (Kents Store, Virginia), a historic house

See also
 Lawton (disambiguation)
 Lawtons